Françoise Van De Moortel (1941–2005) was a Belgian journalist.

1941 births
2005 deaths
People from Ixelles
Belgian women journalists
20th-century Belgian journalists